Pancham is the fifth svara from the seven svaras of Hindustani music and Carnatic music. Pancham is the long form of the syllable प. For simplicity in pronouncing while singing the syllable, Pancham is pronounced as Pa (notation - P). It is also called as पंचम in the Devanagri script.

Details
The following is the information about Panchama and its importance in Indian classical music :

 Pancham is the fifth svara in an octave or Saptak.
 Pancham is the immediate next svara of Madhyam (Ma).
 It is said that Shadja is the basic svara from which all the other 6 svaras are produced. When we break the word Shadja then we get, Shad And Ja. It means that Shad is 6 and ja is 'giving birth' in Marathi. So basically the translation is :
  षड् - 6, ज -जन्म. Therefore it collectively means giving birth to the other six notes of the music.
So the svara Pa is formed from Shadja.
 The frequency of Pancham is 360 Hz. The frequencies of the seven svaras are also given below: Sa 240 Hz, Re 270 Hz, Ga 300 Hz, Ma 320 Hz, Pa 360 Hz, Dha 400 Hz, and Ni 450 Hz, Sa 480 Hz (Taar Saptak) ........ (and so on).
Consequently, the Pa after the Ma of 640  Hz (Taar Saptak) has a frequency of 720  Hz i.e. the double of the Lower octave Pa.
 There are 4 Shruti's of Pancham. Previously the main Shruti not only for Pa but for all the other svaras was on the last Shruti but now it is considered to be on the 1st Shurti.
For example, if these are the 4 Shruti's of Pa then,

                       Previously this was the position of the main Shruti of Pa.
                        ^ 
              1   2  3  4
              ^
              But now this position has become the main Shruti of Pa.

 All the other svaras except Shadja (Sa) and Pancham (Pa) can be  or  but Sa and Pa are always Shuddha svaras. And hence svaras Sa and Pa are called Achal Svaras since these svaras don't move from their original position. Svaras Ra, Ga, Ma, Dha, Ni are called Chal Svaras, since these svaras move from their original position.
    
     Sa, Re, Ga, Ma, Pa, Dha, Ni - Shuddha Svaras
    
     Re, Ga, Dha, Ni - Komal Svaras 
   
     Ma - 

 Ragas where Pa is the Vadi svara - Raga Nat Bhairav, etc. Ragas where Pa is the Samvadi svara - Raga Brindabani Sarang, etc.
 Hypothetically speaking, Pa is said to be the Praja, Praja as in, the three main gods, Bhrama, Vishnu and Shiva were first created i.e. Sakar Bhrama (Sa) and then these three gods created Rishimuni i.e. Re and then Gandharvas were created for singing and then lord Indra or Raja Indra i.e. Mahipal was created and once the Mahipal (Raja) or the king was created, the Praja or the common citizens or the people were made. Pa is made the acronym of Praja or the common people for showing the importance of the syllable Pa.
 Pancham is said to be sourced from call of the cuckoo.
 Pancham is associated with the planet Saturn.
 Pancham is associated with Blue or Black colour.

See also
 List of Ragas in Hindustani classical music
 Svara
 Shadja (Sa)
 Rishabh (Re)
 Gandhar (Ga)
 Madhyam (Ma)
 Dhaivat (Dha)
 Nishad (Ni)

Pa (svara)

References

Hindustani music
Carnatic music